The following songs are available for download for both Lips titles from the Xbox Live Marketplace. Most songs, unless otherwise noted, are available in all Xbox Live enabled locales. Some of the downloadable songs are already available on-disc in some locales. Most songs are available for 160 MSP with some priced at 180 MSP.  In some instances, DLC does not include music videos due to the time the original songs were released. Lastly, genres are shown in the table below as they are listed on the Get Music section.

Since the release of Lips: Deutsche Partyknaller, downloadable German songs have been made available for purchase across the Lips platform, the player does not need to buy Deutsche Partyknaller to download this DLC; however, these songs are restricted to certain locales (Germany, Austria, Switzerland and Belgium). Likewise, after the release of Lips: Canta en Español, new Spanish songs will be available for purchase in Mexico and Spain.

Singles

Main series

Due to reasons unknown some Lips songs have been delisted from the Marketplace

Foreign songs
Ever since the release of Deutsche Partyknaller, some songs have been made available as downloadable content in other regions. These are categorized as Region Locked Songs, since it is impossible to download them outside of their respective locales. The following a list of these foreign songs.

Key:
DE: Germany
ES: Spain/Mexico
NR: Scandinavian countries

Song packs

Artist packs
Song packs offer three songs at a discounted price. They were made available on April 10, 2009 for the first time. Artist song packs cost 440 MSP each. The Colbie Caillat Song Pack was only available through a special promotion starting October 20, 2009. However, it was released one month later as worldwide DLC.

Themed packs
In addition, several miscellaneous song packs are available to choose from various sources. Some are gotten by using the various codes found in either Lips: Number One Hits or Lips: Canta en Español. In the case of NOH, Players can get one of the song packs at no cost. It is unknown whether or not players will be able to purchase other packs at a later date. The following is a list of the bundles and their genre:

Promotions
In December 2008, a-ha's Take On Me was available at no cost as DLC for other countries. This promotion was discontinued around June 2009.
In April 2009, AT&T and iNiS presented the Lips Open Mic contest, in which the winner was to get a song and their respective music video on Lips. The winner of this contest was the electro band, ForeverGirl. On June 11, their song Shake The World was made available as free downloadable content through the Xbox Live Marketplace.
In June 2009, Microsoft teamed up with CrystalRoc, makers of customized music instruments to create limited edition “Lips” wireless microphones made with Swarovski Elements. These special microphones will be handed out as rewards in future contests.
In October 2009, a partnership was made together with retailer Best Buy and pop star Colbie Caillat to release an exclusive three song pack. This song pack was only available as a retail bonus from buying Lips: Number One Hits at Best Buy. The song pack was released as worldwide DLC one month later.
Number One Hits includes a coupon code that lets players download a themed 5 song pack for free. It is unknown whether or not players will be able to purchase the others at a later date. Canta en Español also features a similar promotion.

External links 
 Lips - Official site.

Lips
Dynamic lists
Lips (video game)